Party Girl is an American sitcom based on the 1995 film of the same name that aired briefly on Fox in September 1996 with Christine Taylor, Swoosie Kurtz, and John Cameron Mitchell.

Synopsis
Mary (Taylor) is ensconced in the clubs and parties of New York City. She is finally given a chance to prove herself thanks to Godmother Judy (Kurtz), who hires her to work in a library.

Marketing and reception
Marketing of the series centered around Taylor's recent popularity portraying Marcia Brady in The Brady Bunch Movie. One television commercial featured a parody of the opening/closing credits of The Brady Bunch, but Taylor appeared (as Mary) in each box. Although six episodes were filmed, only four were aired and the show was quickly cancelled.

Cast
 Christine Taylor as  Mary
 Swoosie Kurtz as  Judy Burkhard
 John Cameron Mitchell as  Derrick
 Merrin Dungey as  Wanda
 Matt Borlenghi as  Oneal

Episodes

References

External links
 
 

1990s American sitcoms
1996 American television series debuts
1996 American television series endings
English-language television shows
Fox Broadcasting Company original programming
Live action television shows based on films
Television series by Warner Bros. Television Studios
Television shows set in New York City
Works set in libraries